The term NC machine can refer to:
 Network computer
 Numerical control

For other uses of the abbreviation "NC", see NC (disambiguation).